Eupromerella pseudopropinqua is a species of beetle in the family Cerambycidae. It was described by Ernst Fuchs in 1959.

References

Acanthoderini
Beetles described in 1959